This article is about the particular significance of the year 1974 to Wales and its people.

Incumbents

Secretary of State for Wales – Peter Thomas (until 5 March); John Morris
Archbishop of Wales – Gwilym Williams, Bishop of Bangor
Archdruid of the National Eisteddfod of Wales – Brinli

Events
23 January – A UFO appears to crash in a remote area of North Wales. This becomes known as the Berwyn Mountain Incident.
28 February – In the first United Kingdom general election of 1974, Geraint Howells wins Ceredigion for the Liberals, while Gwynfor Evans fails to retain Carmarthen for Plaid Cymru by three votes.
5 March – Elwyn Jones is appointed Lord Chancellor in Harold Wilson’s government.
1 April – The Local Government Act 1972 comes into effect, reorganising local government areas and incorporating the area of Monmouthshire as part of Wales.
10 October – In the second United Kingdom general election of 1974, Gwynfor Evans  regains his seat at Carmarthen.
22 November – Helen Morgan becomes Miss World; she is forced to resign after four days when it is discovered that she is an unmarried mother.
Tredegar House is bought by Newport Council.
Laura Ashley opens stores in Paris and San Francisco.

Arts and literature
Kyffin Williams is elected to the Royal Academy.
Andrew Vicari is appointed official painter to the Saudi royal family.
The Cory Brass Band is the first Welsh band to win the British National Championship.
The BBC Welsh Symphony Orchestra achieves full symphony status.
Foundation of the Welsh Jazz Society.
Journalist Hugh Cudlipp is created Baron Cudlipp of Aldingbourne.
Glyn Daniel becomes Professor of Archaeology at Cambridge.

Awards

National Eisteddfod of Wales (held in Carmarthen)
National Eisteddfod of Wales: Chair - Moses Glyn Jones
National Eisteddfod of Wales: Crown - William George
National Eisteddfod of Wales: Prose Medal - Dafydd Ifans

New books

English language
Tony Conran - Spirit Level
Gwynfor Evans - Land of my Fathers
Jan Morris - Conundrum
Leslie Norris - Mountains, Polecats, Pheasants
John Ormond - Definition of a Waterfall
Goronwy Rees - Brief Encounters
Alun Richards - Dai Country
Harri Webb - A Crown for Branwen

Welsh language
Islwyn Ffowc Elis - Marwydos
David Jenkins - T. Gwynn Jones: Cofiant
Bobi Jones - Tafod y Llenor
John G. Williams - Maes Mihangel

Music
Andy Fairweather-Low - Spider Jiving (album)
Alun Hoddinott - The Beach of Falesá (opera)
Mike Oldfield - Hergest Ridge (album)

Film
Richard Burton stars in The Klansman.

Welsh-language films
None

Broadcasting
30 September - Independent radio station Swansea Sound comes into operation.

Welsh-language television
8 October - Pobol y Cwm appears for the first time.

English-language television
Richard Burton is banned from BBC productions after complaints about his derogatory comments about Winston Churchill and others in power during World War II.
Windsor Davies makes his first appearance as Sergeant Major Williams in It Ain't Half Hot Mum.

Sport
Curling – The Welsh Curling Association is formed.
Golf – Brian Huggett wins the Portuguese Open.
Snooker – Ray Reardon wins his third World Championship title.
Gareth Edwards wins BBC Wales Sports Personality of the Year.

Births
5 January – Iwan Thomas, athlete
30 January – Christian Bale, actor
3 May – Barry Jones, boxer
11 May – Darren Ward, footballer
29 May – Jenny Willott, politician
3 June – Kelly Jones, rock singer-songwriter-guitarist
25 June – David Park, golfer
11 August – Dafydd Trystan Davies, chair of Plaid Cymru
1 September – Tony Bird, footballer
3 September – Rob Page, footballer
5 September – Becky Morgan, golfer
13 September – Andy Gorman, footballer
20 September (in Suva, Fiji) – Owen Sheers, poet and actor
17 October – Beverley Jones, athlete
18 October – Robbie Savage, footballer
24 October – David Evans, squash player
8 November – Matthew Rhys, actor
12 November – Jonathan Morgan, politician
date unknown – Bedwyr Williams, installation and performance artist

Deaths
9 January – Dora Herbert Jones, singer and administrator, 83
11 January – Joe Jones, dual-code rugby player, 57
21 January – Sandy Griffiths, football referee, 65
11 February – D. Jacob Davies, Unitarian minister, broadcaster, writer and journalist, 57
12 February – Alec Harris, spiritualist medium, 76
3 April 
 David Davies, actor)
 Desmond Donnelly, politician, 53 (suicide)
5 April – Cecil Spiller, cricketer, 73
14 April – Sir Archibald Lush, schools inspector, 74
13 May – Islwyn Evans, Wales international rugby player, 75
11 June – William Jones, dean of Brecon, 76
29 August (in Oxford) – Harold Arthur Harris, academic, 71
9 September – Neil McBride, MP for Swansea East, 64
28 October (in Harrow) – David Jones, poet and artist, 78
November – Bessie Jones singer, 87
14 November - Gomer Hughes, rugby player, 64
24 November - Ivor Jones, footballer, 75
29 December – William Charles Fuller, Victoria Cross recipient, 80

See also
1974 in Northern Ireland

References

 
Wales